Derodontus unidentatus is a species of tooth-necked fungus beetle in the family Derodontidae. It is found in North America.

References

Further reading

 

Derodontidae
Articles created by Qbugbot
Beetles described in 1979